Ordane Kanda-Kanyinda (born 9 September 1996) is a Belgian professional basketball player who last played for Feyenoord Basketball.

Professional career
Kanda-Kanyinda was born in Antwerp and played in the youth development department of Antwerp Giants, where he started his professional basketball career. He played his first game for Antwerp's first team in the 2013–14 season, in the EuroChallenge campaign.

The season 2016–17 was his first year where he was a definitive member of the first Antwerp Giants team. Antwerp finished second in the regular season and lost in the semi-finals of the playoffs.

On 3 July 2017, Kanda-Kanyinda was sent on a one-year loan to Forward Lease Rotterdam of the Dutch Basketball League (DBL). Kanda-Kanyinda led the DBL in scoring, after averaging 18.77 points per game while leading Forward Lease to the play-offs. On 5 May 2018, Kanda recorded 36 points and 11 assists in a decisive game 3 of the quarter-finals, which Rotterdam won 89–92. Rotterdam reached the DBL semi-finals for the first time in 12 years.

In October 2018, Kanda signed with Kangoeroes Basket Mechelen.

Kanda signed with Spirou for the 2019–20 season.

On 4 February 2020, Kanda signed a try-out contract with Heroes Den Bosch.

On 17 July 2020, Kanda returned to Rotterdam, now named Feyenoord.

Career statistics

Domestic leagues

|-|-
|-
| style="text-align:left;"| 2014–15
| style="text-align:left;" rowspan=3 | Antwerp Giants
| 2 || 0 || 3.0 || .000 || –|| .500 || 0.5 || 1.0 || 0.0 || 0.0 || 1.0
|-
| style="text-align:left;"| 2015–16
| 19 || 0 || 8.1 || .333 || .000 || .500 ||0.5 || 0.4 || 0.1 || 0.1 || 1.3
|-
| style="text-align:left;"| 2016–17
| 32 || 14 || 11.7 || .419 || .148 || .679 || 0.8 || 1.1 || 0.3 || 0.1 || 3.0 
|-
| style="text-align:left;"| 2017–18
| style="text-align:left;"| Rotterdam
| 38 || 38 || 31.2 || .500 || .360 || .727 || 5.6 || 4.5 || 1.4 || 0.3 || style="background:#CFECEC;"|18.5*
|-

Source: RealGM

References

1996 births
Living people
Antwerp Giants players
Belgian men's basketball players
Dutch Basketball League players
Feyenoord Basketball players
Heroes Den Bosch players
Kangoeroes Basket Mechelen players
Point guards
Spirou Charleroi players
Sportspeople from Antwerp